Geert van der Weijst (born 6 April 1990) is a Dutch former professional cyclist, who rode professionally between 2012 and 2015 for the  and  squads.

Major results

2011
 8th Kernen Omloop Echt-Susteren
2012
 5th Dorpenomloop Rucphen
 7th Overall Tour de Gironde
1st Stage 3
2013
 1st Rund um Düren
 Tour de Gironde
1st Points classification
1st Stage 4
 1st Stage 3 Kreiz Breizh Elites
 4th Ronde van Midden-Nederland
 9th Overall Oberösterreich Rundfahrt
 10th Beverbeek Classic
2014
 Tour de Gironde
1st Points classification
1st Stage 5
 4th Gooikse Pijl
 6th Overall Tour du Loir-et-Cher
1st Points classification
1st Stage 1
 6th Ronde van Overijssel
 7th Overall Olympia's Tour
1st Stage 2 (TTT)
 7th Münsterland Giro
 8th Ster van Zwolle
 8th Zuid Oost Drenthe Classic I
 8th Ronde van Midden-Nederland
2015
 1st Omloop van het Waasland

References

External links

1990 births
Living people
Dutch male cyclists
People from Reusel-De Mierden
Cyclists from North Brabant
21st-century Dutch people